Robin Peeters (born 30 March 1997) is a Belgian professional footballer who plays for Tempo Overijse in the Belgian Division 3. 

Peeters made his professional debut for OH Leuven on 8 January 2017 in the away match against Union SG.

References 

1997 births
Living people
Belgian footballers
Association football midfielders
Oud-Heverlee Leuven players
Sint-Truidense V.V. players
AS Verbroedering Geel players
K. Rupel Boom F.C. players
Belgian Pro League players
Challenger Pro League players
Luxembourg National Division players
Expatriate footballers in Luxembourg